Fortune Features, Inc. is a Los Angeles-based motion picture company, specialized in worldwide distribution, production and film financing.

Filmography

External links
 

Film production companies of the United States
Film distributors of the United States
Companies established in 2005
Companies based in Los Angeles